Russell Standish may refer to:

 Russell K. Standish, adjunct associate professor  at the University of New South Wales
 Russell R. Standish, who together with Colin forms the Standish brothers, historic Seventh-day Adventists